Luigino Moro (born 15 November 1956) is an Italian former professional racing cyclist. He rode in two editions of the Tour de France.

References

External links
 

1956 births
Living people
Italian male cyclists
People from Valdobbiadene
Cyclists from the Province of Treviso